North Merrick is a hamlet and census-designated place the Town of Hempstead, in Nassau County, on the South Shore of Long Island, in New York, United States. The population was 12,272 at the 2010 census.

Geography

Demographics

As of the census of 2000, there were 11,844 people, 3,963 households, and 3,285 families residing in the CDP. The population density was 6,690.0 per square mile (2,583.6/km2). There were 4,004 housing units at an average density of 2,261.6/sq mi (873.4/km2). The racial makeup of the CDP was 90.6% White, 0.8% African American, 0.1% Native American, 3.2% Asian, 0.1% Pacific Islander, 0.7% from other races, and 0.3% from two or more races. Hispanic or Latino of any race were 5.3% of the population.

There were 3,963 households, out of which 38.3% had children under the age of 18 living with them, 69.6% were married couples living together, 9.7% had a female householder with no husband present, and 17.1% were non-families. 14.1% of all households were made up of individuals, and 8.4% had someone living alone who was 65 years of age or older. The average household size was 2.99 and the average family size was 3.30.

In the CDP, the population was spread out, with 25.2% under the age of 18, 6.0% from 18 to 24, 29.9% from 25 to 44, 23.5% from 45 to 64, and 15.4% who were 65 years of age or older. The median age was 39 years. For every 100 females, there were 94.9 males. For every 100 females age 18 and over, there were 89.5 males.

The median income for a household in the CDP was $80,786, and the median income for a family was $105,190. Males had a median income of $80,054 versus $48,459 for females. The per capita income for the CDP was $30,791. About 1.7% of families and 3.5% of the population were below the poverty line, including 4.7% of those under age 18 and 4.2% of those age 65 or over.

Transportation 
Two limited-access highways, the Meadowbrook State Parkway and the Southern State Parkway, pass through North Merrick; both of these highways are owned and maintained by the New York State Department of Transportation. Additionally, the Meadowbrook State Parkway forms large portions of North Merrick's western border, with Roosevelt and Uniondale.

Other major roadways which pass through the hamlet include Camp Avenue, Jerusalem Avenue, Meadowbrook Road, and Merrick Avenue.

Closest airports include:
 John F. Kennedy International Airport (14 miles, Queens, NY)
 LaGuardia Airport (22 miles, Queens, NY)

Fire department
North Merrick is protected by a volunteer fire department that is responsible for one of the smallest fire districts in Nassau County covering . The North Merrick Fire Department has approximately 85 members using 16 pieces of apparatus located at one station.

See also 
 Merrick, New York

References

External links

 Merrick community website
 North Merrick Fire Department website

Hempstead, New York
Census-designated places in New York (state)
Census-designated places in Nassau County, New York